Cristopher Denzel Cragwell Sjogreen (born 26 June 2001) is a Panamanian professional footballer who plays as a defender for USL Championship club New York Red Bulls II on loan from  Árabe Unido.

Club career

Árabe Unido
Born in Panama City, Cragwell graduated from  Árabe Unido's youth setup, and made his senior debut in the 2019 campaign, aged only 18. He quickly established himself as a first team regular and had his best season in 2020/21 in which he made 15 league appearances and was named to the league's team of the week three times.

New York Red Bulls II
On 1 February 2022 it was announced that Cragwell was joining New York Red Bulls II on a season long loan.

Career statistics

Club

References

External links
Soccerway profile

2001 births
Living people
Panamanian footballers
C.D. Árabe Unido players
New York Red Bulls II players
Liga Panameña de Fútbol players
Panama international footballers
Panamanian expatriate footballers
Expatriate soccer players in the United States
Panamanian expatriate sportspeople in the United States
Sportspeople from Panama City
USL Championship players